Mission Lifeline is an association from Dresden, founded in 2016, whose purpose is to rescue people at sea in the Mediterranean. The rescue ship Lifeline was initially used for this, and since the end of August 2019 the Mission Eleonore has been used.

Founding

According to its own information, it emerged from the Dresden-Balkan convoy, which in October 2015 collected donations in kind for the people on the Balkan route, and took them to Preševo (Serbia) in mid-November with small trucks, Here, they distributed them with the help of volunteers. Further aid convoys to Idomeni and the registration camp on the island of Chios followed. In addition to collecting donations in kind for the aid measures in Greece, an account was set up to allow financial donations.

With the closure of the Balkan route, the escape route across the Mediterranean Sea became increasingly used. "This is how MISSION LIFELINE e.V., which has been planning and preparing the deployment of a rescue ship in the central Mediterranean since April 2016, emerged from the Dresden-Balkan convoy."

In 2017, 200,000 euros in donations were raised to purchase the Sea-Watch 2 and the ship was put into operation as Lifeline.

After the Lifeline was confiscated in summer 2018,  the activists collected 475,000 euros in donations to buy a new ship by mid-October 2018, including funds from the Catholic Church (initiated by Archbishops Reinhard Marx and Hans-Josef Becker) and the music group Die Fantastischen Vier.

Deployment

Lifeline
The mission in the Mediterranean began in September 2017. A rescue operation in June 2018 caused a sensation in which the Lifeline ship with 230 refugees on board had to wait six days before it was allowed to dock in Malta after it had previously been turned away in Italy.

Eleonore
At the end of October 2018, the group sent a 'sailing boat' with a crew of seven activists flying the German flag into the waters off the Libyan coast.

Benjamin Hartmann, owner of the statement fashion label HUMAN BLOOD, officially acted as the buyer for the purchase of the fishing boat Eleonore in May 2019. The subsequent conversion to a rescue ship was financed by the donor and Mission Lifeline. According to the association's founder, Axel Steier, it was necessary to use a 'straw man' because the authorities were unlikely to let him or his captain register a rescue ship. The Eleonore is a pleasure boat. Under the command of Claus-Peter Reisch, she set out again at the end of August 2019 for the sea area off the Libyan coast. The crew was informed about the position of a migrant rubber dinghy by the Alarm-Phone-Initiative and finally took on a total of 104 people from a dinghy. Both Italy and Malta refused requests to enter their ports, so the overcrowded rescue ship had to be supplied with food and water on the high seas. At the beginning of September, after violent thunderstorms, he declared the Eleonore an emergency due to a life-threatening situation on board and ran into the Sicilian port of Pozzallo accompanied by the Italian coast guard, although this was contrary to the instructions of Interior Minister Matteo Salvini, whereupon the Eleonore was confiscated by the Italian police.

In January 2020, Captain  distanced himself from Mission Lifeline and announced that he would no longer operate any more missions. "Political agitation and radical statements" would not get the rescue at sea any further.

In mid-March 2020, the activists collected money to rent an airplane, and want to bring 100 underage migrants from the Moria refugee camp on Lesbos to Berlin.

Rise Above
Because of the confiscation of the two rescue boats after rescue missions, the association eventually sold the Lifeline and acquired a former TF6 Torpedofangboot (torpedo recovery boat) of the German Navy from a private owner. After renovation, it will operate under the name Rise Above for sea rescue in the Mediterranean Sea, from May 2020 at the earliest and be able to accommodate up to 150 people. After some delays in preparing the ship, a naming ceremony was expected during April 2021. The vessel began rescue operations in October 2021.

Criticism

Due to this tweet from January 23, 2019, translated as  a text with the title "Sea Rescuers advertise marriages with refugees" appeared in der Bild on January 28, in which claims are made that the association advertises "marriages of convenience" and that the captain Claus-Peter Reisch is on trial in Malta on charges of “smuggling”. State Secretary at the Federal Ministry of the Interior, Stephan Mayer (CSU), also saw the call for marriages of convenience in the tweet. The association stated that the tweet was to be understood as an appeal for donations. Reisch is not on trial in Malta for “smuggling”, but because he is said to have not properly registered the ship. Mission Lifeline took legal action against die Bild because of false claims against their better judgment. On February 12, 2019, die Bild published a reply to this effect.

Awards

 Peace plaque "Swords to Ploughshares" on October 8, 2019

References 

Sea rescue organizations
European migrant crisis
Immigrant rights activism
Humanitarian aid organizations in Europe
Refugee aid organizations in Europe